Southadka is a pilgrimage centre located at a distance of 3 km from Kokkada in Belthangady Taluk of Dakshina Kannada district.  The uniqueness of the place is Lord Maha Ganapathi is out in the open field without a 'Garbha gudi' and temple structure. It is surrounded by greenery and open round the clock for offering prayers. About 35 km from Kukke Subramanya Temple is 'Southadka Shree Mahaganapathi Kshetra' in the interior of Kokkada. This is about 16 KM from Dharmasthala.  The temple is decorated with lot of Bells mainly, offered by worshippers who have special wishes. One can find lot of monkeys inside the temple.  The Mahapuja is performed every year in the month of January. The temple also serves food to all the devotees in the form of prasadam. The temple is 6 KM from Patrame on the banks of Netravati River.

Belthangady's hidden gem, it's a unique temple with vast expanses of lush greenery. Sitting cozily in the lap of nature amidst such a tranquil atmosphere is Lord Ganapati. Welcome to Southadka, the abode of Lord Ganapati.

Popularly known as Maha Ganapati Kshetra, Southadka in Belthangandy taluk of Dakshina Kannada district is hailed as one of the many siddhi kshetras of the district. Surprisingly, not many from outside the district are aware of the existence of this temple which is located just 20 km away from the pilgrim town of Dharmasthala. Away from the hustle and bustle of the main road, this temple with no formal structure surrounding it, offers a unique experience.

A spacious goshala (cow shed), a row of pretty shops vending pooja materials, a small temple office where seva tickets and prasada can be bought and a modest temple kitchen that dishes up tasty naivedya prasada is all that Southadka houses. The idol of Lord Ganesha, installed majestically under the bowers of an ancient tree, is spectacular, to say the least. A shining arch is all that surrounds the beautiful idol in black stone and, of course, huge brass lamps. Right in front of the Lord's idol are rows of brass bells tied to wooden beams for devotees to sound them during the pooja. These bells in various shapes and sizes are a great attraction among children.

The Name 

In Tulu,  means 'cucumber' and  means 'field'. Cowherds in this place were growing cucumber and they offered the same to Lord Ganapathi of this place during their worship. Hence, this place gets the name as Southadka.

Legend and Origin 

According to the sthala purana of Southadka, a Ganapati temple revered by a royal family was once destroyed by enemies. Not to let the enemies destroy the beautiful idol of Ganapati that was at the temple, cow herds of the place carried it along with them and installed it in a place where cucumber was grown in plenty. Since  means cucumber and  means meadow in Tulu, the place soon gained popularity as Southadka. The farmers of the place reaped huge harvests of cucumber, offered it to Lord Ganapati and even wished to build a temple there. But, according to a popular belief, Ganapati graced their dreams and asked them not to build a temple for him at Southadka as that would mean restrictions on devotees visiting the place to seek his blessings. The Lord expressed his wish to remain in open air with no formal structure surrounding him so that devotees could access him round-the-clock. Lord Ganapati's wish was the farmers’ command and to this day the Lord sits majestically in the lush green surroundings of Southadka, blessing his devotees 24/7.

According to temple authorities, of the many sevas offered at the temple, the most popular one is the avalakki panchakajjaya seva (a delicious mixture of beaten rice, jaggery, til (sesame), coconut, honey and banana) performed on a regular basis. The laddu prasada too shouldn't be given a miss. One word of caution though: whoever performs the avalakki panchakajjaya seva has to share a fair amount of Lord’s prasada with the many cows around.

References

External links 
 https://enarada.com/annual-moodappa-seve-at-the-abode-of-lord-ganapati-nurtures-culture/
Photos of Southadka Shri Mahaganapathi Temple and description
 http://www.deccanherald.com/content/80925/miscellany.html
 http://www.karnatakaholidays.com/southadka.php
 www.youtube.com/watch?v=cyrOxtHDThw
 http://templesofkarnataka.com/navigation/details.php?id=337
 http://rcmysore-portal.kar.nic.in/temples/sowthadkatemple/
 https://enarada.com/moodappa-seva-begins-at-the-southedka-ganapathi-temple/

Hindu pilgrimage sites in India
Hindu temples in Dakshina Kannada district